Breather Life is the fourth studio album released by rapper, Krazy, his first for a major label. It was released on August 7, 2001, on No Limit Records and Priority Records. It features production from Carlos Stephens and Donald XL Robertson. It was independently released through newly created sub-label Soulja Army Records. It peaked at No. 91 on the Top R&B/Hip-Hop Albums chart and No. 31 on the Top Independent Albums chart in Billboard magazine.

Track listing
"Intro"- 2:07
"What Y'all Want"- 3:15 (featuring Snoop Dogg)
"Get Bucked"- 2:47 (featuring Slay Sean)
"My Dog"- 3:25 (featuring Lyric)
"In tha Sky"- 1:13
"I Luv My Project"- 4:12 (featuring Master P & Ezel Swang)
"Tell Me"- 4:14 (featuring D.I.G.)
"For Sure"- 4:50 (featuring Short Circuit)
"Thugged Out"- 4:05 (featuring Soulja Slim)
"I Got"- 3:33 (featuring Erica Fox)
"Downtown"- 3:58 (featuring Suga Bear)
"Black Eyez"- 4:21 (featuring Ed West)
"I Know"- 3:26 (featuring Suga Bear)
"In the Club"- 4:35 (featuring Soulja Slim)
"I Still"- 3:47 (featuring C-Murder)
"When I Make It Home"- 3:27  (feat. Dolliollie of the Ghetto Commission)
"The Truth"- 3:54
"War"- 4:21 (Affical, Slay Sean & Traci)

Personnel
Afficial - Performer, Primary Artist  
Baby Girl-  Performer, Primary Artist  
C-Murder - Guest Artist, Performer, Primary Artist  
D.I.G. - Performer-Primary Artist  
Erica Fox - Performer Primary Artist  
Leslie Henderson-  Photography  
Colin Jahn-  Art Direction, Design  
Krazy -  Performer  
Lyric - Guest Artist, Performer, Primary Artist  
Master P - Performer, Primary Artist  
Donald "XL" Robertson - Producer  
Slay Sean - Primary Artist  
Short Circuit -  Performer, Primary Artist  
Snoop Dogg - Guest Artist, Performer, Primary Artist  
Soulja Slim - Guest Artist, Performer, Primary Artist  
Carlos Stephens - Producer  
Suga Bear -  Guest Artist, Primary Artist, Producer, Vocals  
Ezel Swang -  Primary Artist, Producer, Vocals  
Ed West - Performer, Primary Artist

Chart positions

2001 albums
Krazy (rapper) albums
No Limit Records albums